Trinity Evangelical Divinity School (TEDS) is an academic divinity school founded in 1897 and located in the northern Chicago suburb of Deerfield, Illinois. It is part of and located on the main campus of Trinity International University. It’s among the most conservative and largest theological educational institutions. Since the reorganization of Trinity in 1963 by Kenneth Kantzer, the school has consistently recruited and retained some of the top scholars in the world to serve as faculty.

Overview
TEDS is one of the largest seminaries in the world, enrolling more than 1,200 graduate students in professional and academic programs, including more than 150 in its Ph.D. programs. The most popular degree at the school, the Master of Divinity (M.Div.) degree, prepares pastors, educators, and missionaries for many kinds of service. The school also offers a range of more focused Master of Arts programs in mental health counseling, theological studies, New Testament, Old Testament, and other disciplines. Trinity offers a comprehensive listing of academic programs with Master of Arts(MA), Master of Divinity (M.Div), Master of Theology(Th.M), Doctor of Ministry(D.Min) and Doctor of Philosophy(Ph.D) degrees.

TEDS is affiliated with the Evangelical Free Church of America and is accredited by the Association of Theological Schools in the United States and Canada. It publishes the Trinity Journal.

Trinity honors and continues the legacy of its major contributors through a combination of centers, lectures and honoraria. The Carl F.H. Henry Center is a node to longtime TEDS faculty member and theologian Carl F H Henry which also continues his vision of theological development. The Paul Hiebert Center for World Christianity and Global Theology is named after the Trinity Evangelical Missions department faculty member Paul Hiebert. He made numerous contributions to the field of missions research and practical application on the field. The Hiebert Center at TEDS is designed to foster collaboration between missionary personnel, academics and lay persons from across the world to engage in research and field work. The Kenneth Kantzer Lectures are named after the namesake visionary who shaped Trinity Evangelical Divinity School.

History of TEDS 
Trinity Evangelical Divinity School was incorporated in 1963 as the result of a merge between Trinity Seminary and Bible College and its relocation to Deerfield Illinois. Kenneth Kantzer was elected Dean and had the vision to create a “divinity school” which would be a university environment of biblical studies where world class scholars would produce world class students. Trinity became an academic heavyweight in the late 1960s by hiring top academic faculty in their respective fields. Trinity’s mission, statement of faith and curriculum were greatly influenced by Kenneth Kantzer and Carl F H Henry. Both men are ranked as being among the most important evangelicals of the 20th century. Some of the most notable evangelical scholars came to Trinity due to Dean Kantzers recruiting efforts. These faculty included Robert Culver(Systematic Theology), John Warwick Montgomery (Church history), Walter Kaiser (Old Testament), Richard Troup ( Christian Education), Gleason Archer Jr (Old Testament)and David Hasselgrave (Missions) among several others. Some of the academic faculty who were a part of Fuller Theological Seminary had left the seminary due to its change of stance on biblical inerrancy. The faculty which departed believed in full biblical inerrancy that the Bible doesn’t contain any error whether it is matters of faith but also no error in history or science. Trinity became a rival to Fuller Seminary for the leadership of evangelicalism. Trinity continues to produce first rate scholarship in the 21st century with professors such as Kevin Vanhoozer, Don A Carson, Paul Feinberg, John Feinberg, Paul Hiebert and John Woodbridge holding faculty positions within the school. Trinity continues the legacy of both Kenneth Kantzer and Carl F. H. Henry through the schools operation but also the Carl Henry Center on campus and the Kenneth Kantzer Lectures.

Notable faculty
 Gleason Archer - Former Professor of Old Testament and Semitics (1965-1986)
 Barry J. Beitzel  - Professor Emeritus of Old Testament and Semitic Languages (1976-2016)
 D. A. Carson - New Testament Scholar and Emeritus Professor of New Testament
 John S. Feinberg -  Chair of the Department and Professor of Biblical and Systematic Theology
 Paul D. Feinberg - Late Professor of Systematic Theology and Philosophy of Religion
 Norman Geisler - Former Chair, Department of Philosophy of Religion (1970-1979)
 Murray J. Harris - Professor Emeritus of New Testament Exegesis and Theology
 James K. Hoffmeier - Egyptologist and professor of Old Testament and ancient near eastern history
 S. Lewis Johnson Jr. - Professor of Biblical and Systematic Theology (1980-1985)
 John Warwick Montgomery - Professor of Church History (1964-1974)
 Harold A. Netland - Professor of Philosophy of Religion and Intercultural Studies and the Naomi A. Fausch Chair of Missions
 Grant R. Osborne -  Late Professor of New Testament and author of The Hermeneutical Spiral
 Clark H. Pinnock - Late Professor of Systematic Theology
 Kevin J. Vanhoozer - Research Professor of Systematic Theology
 Keith E. Yandell - Affiliate Professor of Philosophy
 Wayne Grudem - Former Chair of Biblical and Systematic Theology department
 Willem A. VanGemeren - Former Professor of Old Testament
 John D. Woodbridge - Research Professor of Church History and the History of Christian Thought

Notable alumni

 John F. Ankerberg, host of the "John Ankerberg Show"
 Mark Batterson, lead pastor of National Community Church in Washington, D.C.
 Craig Blomberg, New Testament scholar at Denver Seminary
 Elie Buconyori, founder and President of Hope Africa University and Bishop of the free Methodist church in Burundi and Kenya.
 William Lane Craig, apologist and professor of philosophy at Biola University's Talbot School of Theology
 Chip Edgar, Anglican bishop of South Carolina
 W. Kent Fuchs, former provost of Cornell University and president of the University of Florida
 Walter C. Kaiser, retired president of Gordon-Conwell Theological Seminary
 Dan McConchie, member of the Illinois Senate
 Scot McKnight, noted blogger, author, and New Testament scholar at Northern Seminary
 Douglas J. Moo, New Testament scholar and theologian
 James Moore, historian of science at the British Open University and the University of Cambridge, and visiting scholar at Harvard University
 Mark Noll, noted Christian historian, professor of history at the University of Notre Dame
Smokie Norful, Grammy winning gospel singer and pianist
 Michael Young-Suk Oh, Executive Director/CEO of the Lausanne Committee for World Evangelization
 Stanley E. Porter, President, Dean, and Professor of New Testament, McMaster Divinity College
 Cecil R. Richardson, former Chief of Chaplains of the United States Air Force
 John D. Robb, chairman of the International Prayer Council
 John Senyonyi, vice chancellor, Uganda Christian University
 Jeffrey Neil Steenson, bishop in The Episcopal Church, became Roman Catholic
 Steven Tighe, Anglican bishop of the Southwest
 Jim Wallis, author, activist, founder and editor of Sojourners Magazine
 David Falconer Wells, Distinguished Professor of Historical and Systematic Theology at Gordon-Conwell Theological Seminary
Danny Yamashiro, chaplain at Massachusetts Institute of Technology (MIT), researcher on American presidents and childhood trauma, and media talk show host

References

External links

 

 
Evangelical seminaries and theological colleges in the United States
Seminaries and theological colleges in Illinois
Trinity International University
Education in Lake County, Illinois
Evangelicalism in Illinois